Gerd Dudenhöffer (born 13 October 1949 in Bexbach, Saarland) is a German cabaret artist and writer.

Life 
Dudenhöffer studied graphic and design in Munich. Since 1977, he works in Germany as a cabaret artist. His most famous role is Heinz Becker. Dudenhöffer is married and has two children.

Dudenhöffer's character "Heinz Becker" 
Heinz Becker is an elderly catholic-conservative working-class man. He lives with his wife and son in a small rural town, a place where each knows everyone else and people often have family ties between them (the model obviously is Dudenhöffer's home town of Bexbach). Becker has poor formal education, speaks the local dialect and often hesitates to find the right words. Technical or sophisticated terms he normally misuses. The corner stones of his simple life are his friends in the local pub, renovating his house and gardening and participation in the activities of the local volunteers firebrigade and soccer club. With this background he comments on many developments and tendencies of modern metropolitan life: "mixed marriages" between Catholics and Protestants, marriages between homosexuals, old age sexuality, vegetarianism, foreigners and immigrants, climate change etc. He often explains his opinion through comparison to banal experiences made in his community and uses highly politically incorrect language. He is the, seemingly stupid, freshwater philosopher who holds a mirror to intellectuals from the big cities and their life style.

In 1998 occurred a public controversy whether the stage character of "Heinz Becker" has a negative influence on the reputation of the German land of Saarland. Since then Dudenhöffer performs only outside of his homeland of Saarland.

Filmography 

 1991: Pappa ante Portas (waiter)
 1992–2004: Familie Heinz Becker (TV-serie)
 1999: Tach, Herr Dokter! – Der Heinz-Becker-Film

Books 

 1984: Die Heinz Becker Story (Gerhard Bungert, Gerd Dudenhöffer, Charly Lehnert; Queißer Verlag), 
 1986: "…alles geschwätzt!" Heinz Becker erzählt (rororo tomate), 
 1998: Opuscula – Lyrische Gedichde (sic!), Eichborn, 
 1999: Tach Herr Dokter, Eichborn, 
 2001: Opuscula Nova, Eichborn, 
 2005: Die Reise nach Talibu, Handwerker Promotion,

Awards 

 1994: – Telestar for "Beste Comedy-Serie": „Familie Heinz Becker“
 1996: – Saarland Order of Merit
 1997: – Goldene Europa by SR: erfolgreichste Comedy-Serie in der ARD: „Familie Heinz Becker“
 2004: – Deutscher Comedypreis: Beste Comedy-Serie: „Familie Heinz Becker“

External links 
 Official website by Gerd Dudenhöffer

German male comedians
People from Saarpfalz-Kreis
1949 births
Living people
Writers from Saarland
Recipients of the Saarland Order of Merit